El Amir Farouq, also written as Emir Farouk or King Farouk,  was a sloop of the Egyptian Navy launched in 1926 as a passenger cargo ship before conversion to military service in 1936. She was similar in construction and appearance to the Flower-class sloop but differed in engines and armament. She served as the flagship of the Egyptian Navy. On 22 October 1948, the ship was sunk in the Mediterranean Sea off Gaza by an explosive motorboat of the Israeli Navy during the Israeli naval campaign in Operation Yoav as part of the 1948 Arab-Israeli War.

References

1926 ships
Ships built on the River Tyne
Sloops of the Egyptian Navy
Shipwrecks in the Mediterranean Sea
Maritime incidents in 1948
1948 Arab–Israeli War